Logo-I-Pulotu Lemapu Atai-i "Sylvia" Brunt (born 1 January 2004) is a New Zealand rugby union player. She was part of the Black Ferns squad that won the 2021 Rugby World Cup. She also plays for the Blues Women in the Super Rugby Aupiki competition.

Biography 
Brunt attended Mount Albert Grammar School in Auckland. She plays for Ponsonby and for the Auckland Storm in the Farah Palmer Cup.

Brunt played for the Blues in the historic clash with the Chiefs in 2021. She was named in the Blues team for the inaugural season of Super Rugby Aupiki.

Brunt was called in as a travelling reserve for the Black Ferns for the 2022 Pacific Four Series. She made her international debut on 12 June 2022 against Canada in West Auckland. She was recalled into the team for the August Laurie O'Reilly Cup test series against Australia.

Brunt was selected for the Black Ferns 2021 Rugby World Cup 32-player squad. She scored a brace of tries in the second pool game against Wales at the World Cup.

References

External links 
 Black Ferns Profile

2004 births
Living people
New Zealand female rugby union players
New Zealand women's international rugby union players
Rugby union centres
People educated at Mount Albert Grammar School